The term Finglish was coined by professor Martti Nisonen in the 1920s in Hancock, Michigan, to describe a mixture of Finnish and English he encountered in America. The word is first recorded in English in 1943.

As the term describes, Finglish is a macaronic mixture of the English and Finnish languages. In Finglish, the English lexical items are nativized and inserted into the framework of Finnish morphology and syntax. Many consider the adoption of English loanwords into Finnish phonology, morphology, and syntax not to be proper Finnish, but rather a language in between. The term "Finglish" can imply that this adoption of loanwords and usage of language is incomplete and somehow less legitimate. However, this use of loanwords and code-switching amongst bilingual speakers is typical in communities experiencing language shift. The Finnish immigrants of United States learned English out of necessity to succeed in their jobs the results of this resulted in what is known as "Finglish." Finglish is also found in any place in Finland where international contacts and popular culture exists, including Finnish language learners. This more recent (post 1980s) incorporation of English loanwords into modern Finnish as a result of globalization and advances in technology is a separate phenomenon from the North American Finnish, which developed primarily in the late 1800s- mid 1900s, though there are some similarities in form and function.

History
While almost all Finnish immigrants were able to read and write, it still took some time for many Finns to learn English because Finnish is a Finno-Ugric language, structurally unrelated to English and other Indo-European languages. Another reason for the delay is that many leaving Finland were farmers and laborers, and often migrated to areas of high Finnish settlement. Living and working with other Finnish speakers meant they had less need to learn English to get by in their day-to-day lives. Many other Finnish immigrants ended up in menial and industrial jobs, where they learned English through practice in order to get by in the workplace. Second and third generation Finnish Americans often learned to speak both Finnish and English, though the Finnish they learned differed from that spoken in Finland. This was due to a variety of reasons, including competing language inputs between Finnish and English and the fact that their Finnish input may have been different from that considered standard in Finland. Finglish originated amongst these first and second generation Finnish immigrants in US and Canada. The English language skills of the first generation American Finns tended to be limited; second and third-generation American Finns usually were more or less bilingual. Finglish emerged as a pidgin with something they already knew (Finnish) and something they were bound to learn (English).

As has been documented for several immigrant languages, one would expect that over time North American Finnish would reduce its inflectional system in favor of prepositions and analytic constructions. Nominal morphology is particularly vulnerable in heritage languages with robust morphology. As heritage speakers tend to become fluent in the majority language while never achieving native fluency in the heritage language, second and third generation speakers who learn the minority language from the first generation may not acquire the full inflectional system of the language spoken in the country of origin. The majority language may also influence the syntax and other features of the heritage language. Thus, North American Finnish differed not only in the lexical items used, but in aspects of morphology and syntax as well.

The majority of immigrants to America came from Ostrobothnia and the Northern Ostrobothnia areas in western Finland; over sixty percent of all emigrants who left the country  between 1893 and 1920 came from the provinces of Vaasa and Oulu. Many other Finnish immigrants were from the provinces of Savonia and Tavastia, and the Finnish spoken in North America also reflects those dialects.

History of research
Much work has been done in the last fifty years to document the speech of Finnish Americans in the United States and Canada, though little new data has been brought forward in the last 25 years. Pertti Virtaranta did extensive research on the Finnish spoken in North America, particularly in the Upper Midwest and Canada, taking three trips from 1965-1980 to interview speakers. The interviews had standard questions asked of everyone including: why they (or their families) left Finland, what was the trip like, and how was it finding a job once in America. Otherwise, the interviews consisted of free conversation on whatever subject the participants found most interesting. Maisa Martin wrote a dissertation on the phonology and morphology of American Finnish where she discusses the borrowings and changes between Finland Finnish and American Finnish. Donald Larmouth did extensive research on the Finnish used by four generations in rural Finnish communities in northern Minnesota, interviewing a total of 62 respondents. In his interviews he elicits personal narratives, has participants complete picture identification tasks with simple cartoons, and give translations of sentences. He documents what changes the language seems to have undergone, notably the leveling of several cases including the accusative and partitive. 
This previous work on American Finnish reveals a lower frequency of accusative case and partitive case in heritage bilingual speakers with more pronounced changes the farther removed the generation was from the immigrant generation. In his interviews he elicits personal narratives, has participants complete picture identification tasks with simple cartoons, and give translations of sentences. While the partitive and accusative were vulnerable, other cases  including the illative and ablative  remained robust in the speech of these speakers, though adjective case endings were especially prone to deletion. These previous works focus primarily on Finnish speakers in Minnesota and Michigan with Wisconsin underrepresented.

The most common characteristic of historical Finglish were (in descending order of frequency):

Words used in US Finglish often have completely different meanings in Finnish, especially when the Finglish terms are borrowings from English; they have become expressive loans: ruuma (from and meaning 'room'; in Finnish meaning 'cargo hold'"), piiri ('beer'; 'district'), leijata ('to play'; 'to hover'), reisi ('crazy'; 'thigh'), and touvi ('stove'; 'halyard'). US Finglish compound words can produce combinations completely incomprehensible to native Finnish speakers, like piirikäki ('beer keg'; 'district cuckoo') or the somewhat less incomprehensible ilmapiika ('flight attendant'; 'air maid').

These older Finglish usages may not be bound to survive, and their original users are now in their 80s and 90s. The descendants of most American Finns are today either completely monolingual, or, if they have kept their ties to their grandparents' and great-grandparents' speech, use ordinary Finnish beside English.

Example of old-style Finglish:

which translates as

For comparison, standard Finnish without anglicisms:

Relatively few words from Finglish have become standard Finnish, but note  'log cabin' or "(temporary) accommodation', from English camp; and  'miner'.  These may, however, be direct borrowings from English in Finland.

Later Finglish
A new wave of Finglish has originated in Finland. Its sources are technology, popular culture, various sub-cultures, and fandom. It differs from slang in the sense that it also uses some English linguistic structures. Examples of some popular-culture Finglish expressions include vörkkiä ('to work'), biitsi ('beach'), spreijata ('to spray'), hengailla ('to hang out'), kruisailla ('to cruise in an automobile') and hevijuuseri ('heavy user'). While the earlier, North American Finglish was distinctively a working-class adult immigrants' language, the newer sort of Finglish is used by native Finnish youth in contact with the English language through mass and social media. Finglish terms of today are a transitional phase of absorption of new terms and ideas from English into mainstream Finnish before the full nativization of the words, especially in situations where English (a very productive yet compounding language) expresses a concept with one word, while Finnish would require several of them, or has no native term. This Finglish is not to be confused with Helsinki slang, though the latter has absorbed some English loan words, too, in recent times.

The characteristics of current Finglish, in descending order of frequency, are:

An example of today's Finglish might be:

which translates as

For comparison, without anglicisms, but still colloquial:

And, in more literary Finnish:

Technical speech
Finglish is today used most commonly in technology-related speech, where the majority of the loanwords originate in English. Since the English and Finnish language morphologies are vastly different and English pronunciation seldom fits in the Finnish speech immediately, the loan's orthography and pronunciation are nativized. Direct Finglish teknopuhe ('techspeak') expressions include printteri ('printer' – it is currently being ousted by the native word ), modeemi ('modem'), and prosessori or prossu ('processor' – there is even a puristic word, which is heard often enough, but is still less common than the borrowings). Reified initialisms in Finglish include seepu from English CPU, and dimmi from DIMM. Finglish is usually considered a transitional phase from literal loans into translationary loans (calques). An example of a word where the transition is partial, is webbiselain ('Web browser'), where the word web has not yet been translated into Finnish  (verkkoselain is however now the standard term and is widely used).

An example of Finnish techspeak:

which would translate in English:

and a less anglicised, but still colloquial Finnish:

An approximation in literary Finnish:

Neologisms
Sometimes English words are used as the basis of Finnish conceptual neologisms, like nörtti 'computer enthusiast', from English nerd; or nyypiö, nyyppä, or noobi 'newbie', i.e. 'beginner' (the first two variants influenced by the native Finnish , meaning a 'freak' or 'eccentric person').

'practical joke') for native Finnish  ('prank', 'shenanigan').

English loanwords that originate in Latin are usually amalgamated in Finnish by using the Latin and not English orthography and grammar.

See also

Tankero
American Finnish

References

External links
 "Finglish" by Kent Randell 
 "The Gluffer’s Guide to Finglish" Six Degrees (No. 6, 2008)

Macaronic forms of English
Finnish language
Finnish-American history